"Weatherman" is a science fiction short story by American writer Lois McMaster Bujold, first published in the February 1990 issue of Analog Science Fiction and Fact. It was later included in The Space Opera Renaissance collection. Written as a prelude story starring a character used by Bujold in the Vorkosigan Saga, it was republished as the first six chapters of The Vor Game. "Weatherman" was nominated for the Nebula Award for Best Novella, while The Vor Game won the Hugo Award for Best Novel.

Plot summary
Miles Vorkosigan is sent to Lazkowski Base on Kyril Island to replace the meteorology officer there, who is retiring. This decision does not please Miles who believes the job was mistakenly given to him.  He speaks with Major Cecil, the officer in charge of personnel assignment at the academy, who explains to him that the assignment and its location will require courage and strength to survive and, depending on his performance, could lead to Miles being assigned to the Imperial Orbital Shipyard commissioning the Prince Serg, soon to become the Barrayaran Navy flagship. Miles finally arrives at Lazkowski Base and immediately tries to meet with the officer he is to replace, Lieutenant Ahn, whom he finds asleep and drunk in his office.  He leaves without waking the man, and the next morning returns to finds him sober and capable of explaining to him his new job as the base meteorology officer.  Miles observes Ahn as he makes his daily weather forecast, but notices that the officer's forecast is less a matter of scientific calculation than practical experience.  After an all-too-brief orientation to his new duties, Ahn departs, leaving Miles in charge.

In short order, Miles experiences an almost fatal situation in which he is almost suffocated by mud and frozen to death. By this he gets to meet Metzov, the base commander, who punishes him for what had happened, particularly for not following the instructions from the manual which specified parking spots, and for that reason he had let his vehicle and other tools be covered by the mud. His punishment consists of extra hours of work. When he is finished with his punishment he remembers what Ahn had told him before he left: never be in Metzov's way. Miles wants to find out more about Metzov and asks his cousin Ivan to send him files from his post with Imperial Security. Ivan shows him the documents and Miles realizes that Metzov has an obscured past.

Miles wakes up after a two-hour sleep and listens to sirens - while men were moving a couple of barrels, one fell and broke, letting out a mutagenic poison invented as a terror weapon. The barracks is basically sealed and the men are ordered to clean up the mess by Metzov, but given inadequate protection to do so.

There is a revolt, and all of the men are thrown outside by Metzov into the polar conditions, naked, and left to die unless they clean up the mess. Miles joins the mutiny in order to force Metzov to back down - while Metzov might be willing to let the men freeze, the fallout from letting the Prime Minister's son die would be too bad to escape from. Metzov backs down from his lethal orders, but all the techs and Miles end up being arrested, and Miles is sent back where he faces his father the “great Vorkosigan” and spymaster Simon Illyan.

Characters
 Miles Vorkosigan, the main character of the story and also of the  Vorkosigan Saga. Born physically disabled due to the use of a chemical warfare agent in an assassination attempt against his parents while his mother was pregnant with him. A master of manipulation due to his physical disabilities (very fragile bones made it impossible for him to walk until he was almost school age).
 Lieutenant Ahn, the retiring Lazkowski Base Weather Officer that Miles is replacing. He is a functional alcoholic.
 General Metzov, the commander of Lazkowski Base.  A Komarr Conquest veteran whose career stalled after allegations of torture. Contemptuous of the modern Barrayaran military's "soft service."

References

External links 
 
 

Vorkosigan Saga